The individual BC3 boccia event at the 2012 Summer Paralympics is being contested from 5 to 8 September at ExCeL London.

Seeding matches 

Three preliminary matches were held to determine the participants' seed for the tournament bracket.

Draw

Finals

5th–8th place matches

Top half

Bottom half

Final ranking

References 

 

Individual BC3